American Dragon may refer to:

 Bryan Danielson, professional wrestler who used the ring name "American Dragon"
 American Dragon: Jake Long, an animated television series

See also
 American Dragons, a 1998 film